"Me + You" is a song recorded by American R&B singer Monica for her yet-to-be-released ninth studio album, Trenches. It was written by Monica and Kyle Christopher along with Denisia "Blu June" Andrews and Brittany "Chi" Coney, while production was helmed by Andrews and Coney under their production moniker Nova Wav. The song was released as the album's second single on April 26, 2019, and reached number 17 on the US Billboard Adult R&B Songs.

Critical reception
Soulbounce found that the "upbeat track is filled with bright, happy synths that flutter and buzz about like butterflies around her vocals. Meanwhile, 808s keep everything anchored and allow the  addition of trappy drums to not seem jarring. Monica, meanwhile, rides the beat happily as she describes what it's like to love her man [...] It's a sweet sentiment and one that's sure to resonate with all the lovers in the house."

Chart performance
Released as the follow-up to her number-one hit "Commitment" (2019), debuted on the US Billboard Adult R&B Songs on September 7, 2019. It eventually peaked at number 17 on December 14, 2022, becoming her 18th top ten entry on the chart.

Promotion
A lyric video for "Me + You" premiered online on April 30, 2019.

Track listing
Digital download
 "Me + You" – 3:34

Credits and personnel
Credits adapted from Tidal.

Denisia Andrews – producer, writer 
Monica Arnold – vocals, writer
Brittany Coney – producer, writer 
Melinda Dancil – music director, production assistant
Kyle Christopher – writer

Charts

Release history

References

External links
Monica.com – official website

2019 singles
Monica (singer) songs
2019 songs
Songs written by Monica (singer)